José Celín Discua Elvir (born 26 August 1950 in Valle de Ángeles) is a Honduran politician who currently serves as deputy of the National Congress of Honduras representing and leadering the National Party of Honduras for El Paraíso.

References

1950 births
Living people
Deputies of the National Congress of Honduras
National Party of Honduras politicians
People from El Paraíso Department